Logan Hyperdome Shopping Centre in Shailer Park, Queensland, is the largest shopping centre in Logan City and one of the largest single storey shopping centres in Australia.

The Queensland Police Service operates a police beat shopfront in the centre. Logan City Council has a library at the far northern end of the Hyperdome and this is a separate, stand alone building. The Logan Hyperdome contains a food court with many outlets.  Event Cinemas operate a cinema complex within the centre.

History 
Built after the closure and demolition of Wild Waters water park, the Hyperdome first opened in August 1989.  Work at the site began in September 1988 and it was officially opened in July 1989. It received upgrades in  May 1990, October 1997, December 1998, March 2005 and August 2015. The October 1997 upgrade was the largest upgrade when  BI-LO Mega Frrresh (closed 30 June 2017) was moved from its original location where the now-defunct Crazy Clark's is located and Big W was added along with around 50 specialty stores and a 2-storey carpark. The 2005 upgrade included upgrading the Event Cinemas to 12 (previously 'Pacific 8') and installing a bowling alley (AMF Hyperbowl), another carpark and several restaurants and  bars in the newly constructed piazza. The 2015 upgrade cost $17 million and revamped the southern end of the shopping centre, creating a new area called The Market Room. This area features several fresh food retailers and restaurants.

The Logan Hyperdome Library opened in 1998 with a major refurbishment in 2014.

In January 2019, Myer closed its doors due to lack of customers.

Hyperdome Home Centre 
In addition, the Hyperdome Home Centre separated from the main Hyperdome mall area.

Transport 
It contains the Loganholme Bus Station located in Zone 3 for TransLink services.

See also

 List of shopping malls in Australia

References

External links
Logan Hyperdome Official website

Shopping centres in Queensland
Buildings and structures in Logan City
Shopping malls established in 1989
1989 establishments in Australia